Hank Walbrick (c. 1953) is a former American football coach. He served as the head football coach at the East Central University in Ada, Oklahoma from 1990 to 1998, compiling a record of 34–58–1 and winning an NAIA Division I Football National Championship in 1993.  A native of Lawton, Oklahoma, Walbrick played football at Lawton High School and college football at East Central, where he started at linebacker for three seasons.  He returned to Lawton High School in 1977 as an assistant football coach.

Head coaching record

References

Year of birth missing (living people)
1950s births
Living people
American football linebackers
East Central Tigers football coaches
East Central Tigers football players
High school football coaches in Oklahoma
People from Lawton, Oklahoma
Players of American football from Oklahoma